Deadwood Peak is a 6,280-foot-elevation (1,910 meter) mountain summit located on the eastern border of Mount Rainier National Park. It is also situated on the shared border of Pierce County and Yakima County in Washington state. Deadwood Peak is set on the crest of the Cascade Range, immediately north of Yakima Peak and Chinook Pass, with the Pacific Crest Trail traversing its east slope. Its nearest higher peak is Naches Peak,  to the southeast. Deadwood Peak takes its name from Deadwood Lakes  and Deadwood Creek to its northwest, and their names came from the large number of downed trees in the area. From Chinook Pass, a short scramble up the south side leads to the summit with unobstructed views of Mount Rainier.

Climate
Deadwood Peak is located in the marine west coast climate zone of western North America. Most weather fronts originate in the Pacific Ocean, and travel northeast toward the Cascade Mountains. As fronts approach, they are forced upward by the peaks of the Cascade Range (Orographic lift), causing them to drop their moisture in the form of rain or snowfall onto the Cascades. As a result, the west side of the Cascades experiences high precipitation, especially during the winter months in the form of snowfall. During winter months, weather is usually cloudy, but, due to high pressure systems over the Pacific Ocean that intensify during summer months, there is often little or no cloud cover during the summer. Because of maritime influence, snow tends to be wet and heavy, resulting in high avalanche danger. Precipitation runoff from Deadwood Peak drains west into tributaries of the White River, and east to Yakima River.

Gallery

References

External links
 National Park Service web site: Mount Rainier National Park
 Deadwood Peak photo: Flickr
 National Weather Service Forecast

Cascade Range
Mountains of Pierce County, Washington
Mountains of Washington (state)
Mountains of Yakima County, Washington